Chicholi tehsil is a fourth-order administrative and revenue division, a subdivision of third-order administrative and revenue division of Betul district of Madhya Pradesh.

Geography
Chicholi tehsil has an area of 438.04 sq kilometers. It is bounded by Harda district in the southwest, west and northwest, Hoshangabad district in the north, Shahpur tehsil in the northeast and east, Betul tehsil in the southeast and Bhainsdehi tehsil in the south.

See also 
Betul district

Citations 

Tehsils of Madhya Pradesh
Betul district